The Wade H. Jones Sr. House, also known as the Kleiner House, is a historic house located on Meeker Road in Meeker, Louisiana.  It was built in 1935 in the Colonial Revival style. It was added to the National Register of Historic Places in 1987.

It is a two-story brick house built in 1913 and was renovated in 1935.  It has a portico with four monumental two-story Tuscan columns added in the renovation.  Also added were a porte-cochere on one side and a sunporch on the other.  An effect of the renovation was to bring the house into, broadly speaking, Colonial Revival style.

References

Houses on the National Register of Historic Places in Louisiana
Colonial Revival architecture in Louisiana
Houses completed in 1935
Houses in Rapides Parish, Louisiana
National Register of Historic Places in Rapides Parish, Louisiana
1935 establishments in Louisiana